Choeteprosopa is a genus of bristle flies in the family Tachinidae. There are at least four described species in Choeteprosopa.

Species
These four species belong to the genus Choeteprosopa:
 Choeteprosopa auriceps Aldrich, 1925 c g
 Choeteprosopa cyanea Macquart, 1851 c g
 Choeteprosopa cyaneiventris (Macquart, 1846) c g
 Choeteprosopa hedemanni (Brauer & Bergenstamm, 1891) c g
Data sources: i = ITIS, c = Catalogue of Life, g = GBIF, b = Bugguide.net

References

Further reading

External links

 
 

Tachinidae